Mazzucato is a surname. Notable people with the surname include:

 Alberto Mazzucato, Italian musician
 Anna Mazzucato, professor of mathematics
 Augusto Mazzucato, Italian soccer player
 Carla Carli Mazzucato, Italian artist
 Francesca Mazzucato, Italian writer and translator
 Giovanni Mazzucato (1787-1814), Italian botanist
 Mariana Mazzucato, Italian economist
 Michele Mazzucato, Italian astronomer
 Nicola Mazzucato, Italian rugby coach
 Roberto Mazzucato, Italian athlete
 Valerio Mazzucato, Italian soccer player

Mazzucato may also refer to:
 35461 Mazzucato, main belt asteroid

Surnames
Italian-language surnames